Amanda Eubanks Winkler is a British-American scholar of English music and theater. She is Professor of Music History and Cultures and Chair of the Department of Art and Music Histories at Syracuse University College of Arts and Sciences. Since 2017, she has collaborated with theater historian Richard Schoch on the AHRC Research Project Performing Restoration Shakespeare.

Education 
Eubanks Winkler completed a B.M. in music history and literature and vocal performance, summa cum laude at Illinois State University in 1994. She earned a M.A. in musicology from University of Michigan (UM) in 1996 and a Ph.D. from the same institution in 2000.

Career 
Eubanks Winkler joined the faculty of Syracuse University College of Arts and Sciences in 2001. Her research focuses on English theater music and culture. She was the Co-Investigator on Performing Restoration Shakespeare, a project funded by the Arts & Humanities Research Council, UK (2017-2020) and she is a General Editor for The Collected Works of John Eccles (A-R Editions). She has published on a range of topics, including books and essays on Restoration theater music, music and Shakespeare, children's performances in early modern England, performance practice, and contemporary Broadway musicals. More recently, she has engaged with practice-based research, running workshops that staged excerpts of William Davenant's Macbeth and Charles Gildon's Measure for Measure (Folger Theatre, Washington DC) and Thomas Middleton's The Witch (Blackfriars Conference, Staunton, VA). As part of the Performing Restoration Shakespeare project, she served as music director for a workshop of the Restoration-era Tempest (Sam Wanamaker Playhouse, Shakespeare's Globe, London) and co-led a workshop for scholars and served as a consultant for a full professional production of Davenant’s Macbeth at the Folger Theatre, Washington DC.

Selected works

Books 
 
 
 Eubanks Winkler, Amanda (2020). Music, Dance, and Drama in Early Modern English Schools. Cambridge University Press. .
 Eubanks Winkler, Amanda and Schoch, Richard (2021). Shakespeare in the Theatre: Sir William Davenant and the Duke's Company. Arden Shakespeare/Bloomsbury. ISBN 9781350130579

References

External links 
 

Living people
Year of birth missing (living people)
Illinois State University alumni
University of Michigan alumni
Syracuse University faculty
21st-century American women writers
American music historians
American women historians
21st-century American historians
21st-century American musicologists
American women musicologists
American people of English descent